The Season of Apostles (also known by various Syriac transliterations, such as Slihe and Shleehe) is a liturgical season in East Syriac Christianity. The season begins with the feast of Pentecost and continues for seven weeks. It is followed by the Season of Summer.

The season is so named because it commemorates the missionary activities of the apostles of Jesus after the events of Pentecost.

The following feasts are fixed to certain days in the Season of Apostles:

 Friday after Pentecost: Friday of Gold
 Sunday after Pentecost: The Holy Trinity
 Thursday after the Second Sunday of Apostles: The Body and Blood of Christ
 Friday after the Third Sunday of Apostles: Sacred Heart of Jesus
 Saturday after the Third Sunday of Apostles: Immaculate Heart of Mary
 Friday after the Seventh Sunday of Apostles: The Seventy Disciples of Jesus

The season ends with the Feast of the Twelve Apostles on the First Sunday of Summer.

See also 
 Pentecost season

References 

Liturgical seasons
Pentecost
Syriac Christianity